Rodney Wagner (born 30 July 1955) is an Australian archer. He competed in the men's individual and team events at the 1988 Summer Olympics.

References

External links
 

1955 births
Living people
Australian male archers
Olympic archers of Australia
Archers at the 1988 Summer Olympics
Place of birth missing (living people)